The ProCredit Holding is the parent company of a development-oriented group of commercial banks for small and medium enterprises (SMEs), which operate in Southeastern Europe, Eastern Europe, Ecuador, and Germany. The business model of the group is based on "socially responsible banking".

The group’s core business consists of offering banking services to small and medium-sized enterprises (SMEs). An emphasis is placed on expanding the group’s green loan portfolio and promoting local production, especially in agriculture. In addition to serving SMEs, the ProCredit group also pursues a direct banking strategy for private clients, particularly the growing middle class.

ProCredit Holding, which began as Internationale Micro Investitionen AG, was founded in 1998 and is currently managed by Sandrine Massiani, Dr Gabriel Schor, Dr Gian Marco Felice and Christian Dagrosa. The company has a Fitch Rating of BBB. As the group’s superordinated institution, it is regulated by the German and European supervisory authorities.

According to the group’s annual report for 2020, the total assets of the ProCredit group amounted to approximately EUR 7.3 billion. It holds customer deposits of about EUR 4.9 billion and has a gross loan portfolio of around EUR 5.3 billion.

The promotion of green loans to finance projects in the fields of energy efficiency and renewable energies (Pillar III) is the strategic focus here. In 2020, approximately 40% of the group’s total loan portfolio growth was in green loans.

ProCredit Holding banks
A full list of the banks in the ProCredit group can be found in the following table.

Shareholders
The following shareholders held more than 5% of the shares in ProCredit Holding as of 21 December 2016, thus representing the main shareholders:
 Zeitinger Invest GmbH (17.0%)
 KfW (13.2%)
 The Dutch DOEN Participaties (12.5%)
 IFC (10%)
TIAA (8.6%)
 Other shareholders (together 38.7%)

References

External links
 Procredit Holding website

Banks of Germany